The Cherry Creek Bridge is a concrete arch bridge spanning Cherry Creek near Franktown, Colorado. State Highway 83 runs atop it. It was built in 1948 by J.H.& N.M. Monaghan & Associates and is listed on the National Register of Historic Places. It is located within Castlewood Canyon State Park.

Its design and construction are credited to the Colorado Department of Highways and J.H.& N.M. & Associates.

It was a post-war exception to the practice of using lighter concrete bridge designs in the state.

See also
National Register of Historic Places listings in Douglas County, Colorado

References

Road bridges on the National Register of Historic Places in Colorado
Bridges completed in 1948
Transportation buildings and structures in Douglas County, Colorado
National Register of Historic Places in Douglas County, Colorado
Concrete bridges in the United States
Open-spandrel deck arch bridges in the United States